The Cami river is a tributary of the Saint-Jean River, flowing in the municipality of  Lalemant, Hébertville-Station and Rivière-Éternité, in the  Fjord-du-Saguenay, in the administrative region of Saguenay-Lac-Saint-Jean, in the province of Quebec, in Canada. The course of the Cami river crosses the zec du Lac-au-Sable.

The Cami river valley is served along its entire length by the Lac-Desprez road, for forestry and recreational tourism activities. Some secondary forest roads serve this valley.

Forestry is the main economic activity in the sector; recreational tourism, second.

The surface of the Cami River is usually frozen from the beginning of December to the end of March, however the safe circulation on the ice is generally made from mid-December to mid-March.

Geography 
The main watersheds neighboring the Cami River are:
 north side: Bailloquet Lake, Otis Lake, Périgny Lake, Éternité River, Lac à la Truite, Saguenay River;
 east side: Saint-Jean river, Quarante-Quatre lake;
 south side: rivière à la Catin, Épinglette Stream, Malbaie River, Desprez Lake, Porc-Épic River;
 west side: Brébeuf Lake, Lac des Canots, Papinachois stream, Ha! Ha! River, rivière à Mars.

The Cami River takes its source at the confluence of Desprez Lake in a deep valley. This source is located at:
  south-east of a mountain peak which reaches  ;
  north-east of a curve of the course of ruisseau à John;
  north of a curve in the course of the Malbaie River;
  south-west of a curve of the course of the rivière à la Catin;
  south of the mouth of Brébeuf Lake;
  south-west of the confluence of the Cami river and the Saint-Jean River.

Upper course of the Cami River (segment of )
  to the northeast by collecting a discharge (coming from the west) from Isolation Lake, to a bend in the river, corresponding to a stream (coming from the southeast);
  to the north in the marsh area, collecting the discharge from Lac Éloigné and Lac en Poire, as well as passing east of a mountain whose summit reaches , to a bend in the river;
  north-west in the marsh area to the outlet (coming from the south-west) of a group of lakes;
  towards the northwest by collecting the discharge (coming from the south) of the Lac de la Grosse Femelle, up to La Petite Rivière (coming from the west);
  towards the northeast by forming a large curve at the start of the segment to go around a mountain whose summit reaches  and collecting the discharge (coming from the north (west) of a few lakes, as well as the outlet (coming from the southwest) of Lac Aurel, up to a outlet (coming from the west) of Lac à Fournel;

Lower course of the Cami River (segment of )
  towards the north in a deep valley, forming a curve towards the east at the start of the segment, up to a stream (coming from the south-east);
  north-west in a deep valley and crossing some rapids, up to a stream (coming from the north-west);
  north-east across a few rapids to the outlet (coming from the north-west) of a lake;
  towards the northeast in a deep valley, crossing some rapids and bending towards the north;
  north-east, up to the confluence of the rivière à la Catin (coming from the south-east);
  north on a plain, to its mouth.

The Cami river flows on the south bank of the Saint-Jean River. This mouth is located at:
  north-east of the mouth of the Brébeuf Lake (confluence with the Saint Jean River);
  south-west of the village center of Rivière-Éternité;
  south-west of the confluence of the Saint-Jean River and Anse Saint-Jean (Saguenay River);
  south of a bay on Éternity Lake;
  south-east of downtown Saguenay (city).

From the confluence of the Cami river, the current:
 follows the course of the Saint-Jean River (Saguenay River tributary) on  generally towards the northeast;
 follows the course of the Saguenay River on  eastward to Tadoussac where it merges with the Estuary of Saint Lawrence.
  west of  Tadoussac.

Toponymy 
The toponym "Cami river" was formalized on June 29, 1983, by the Commission de toponymie du Québec.

Notes and references

Appendices

Related articles 
 Le Fjord-du-Saguenay Regional County Municipality
  Lalemant, a TNO
 Hébertville-Station, a  municipality
 Rivière-Éternité, a municipality
 Zec du Lac-au-Sable, a controlled exploitation zone
 Desprez Lake
 Brébeuf Lake
 La Petite Rivière
 Rivière à la Catin
 Saint-Jean River
 Saguenay River
 List of rivers of Quebec

External links 

Rivers of Saguenay–Lac-Saint-Jean
Le Fjord-du-Saguenay Regional County Municipality